Te Hapara is a suburb of the New Zealand city of Gisborne. It is located in the northwest of the city. It contains one primary school, Te Hapara School, which is located in Mill Road.

Demographics

Te Hapara had a population of 7,749 at the 2018 New Zealand census, an increase of 600 people (8.4%) since the 2013 census, and an increase of 645 people (9.1%) since the 2006 census. There were 2,802 households, comprising 3,732 males and 4,026 females, giving a sex ratio of 0.93 males per female, with 1,806 people (23.3%) aged under 15 years, 1,488 (19.2%) aged 15 to 29, 3,213 (41.5%) aged 30 to 64, and 1,248 (16.1%) aged 65 or older.

Ethnicities were 58.2% European/Pākehā, 50.7% Māori, 5.6% Pacific peoples, 5.1% Asian, and 1.3% other ethnicities. People may identify with more than one ethnicity.

The percentage of people born overseas was 12.4, compared with 27.1% nationally.

Although some people chose not to answer the census's question about religious affiliation, 48.5% had no religion, 35.7% were Christian, 3.7% had Māori religious beliefs, 1.0% were Hindu, 0.3% were Muslim, 0.4% were Buddhist and 2.0% had other religions.

Of those at least 15 years old, 723 (12.2%) people had a bachelor's or higher degree, and 1,398 (23.5%) people had no formal qualifications. 429 people (7.2%) earned over $70,000 compared to 17.2% nationally. The employment status of those at least 15 was that 2,796 (47.0%) people were employed full-time, 810 (13.6%) were part-time, and 285 (4.8%) were unemployed.

Parks

Te Hapara has two sports grounds: the Harry Barker Reserve (for cricket and hockey) and Barry Park.

Blackpool Street Reserve is a local park and dog walking area.

Education

Rolls are as of

References

Suburbs of Gisborne, New Zealand